Semantic computing is a field of computing that combines elements of semantic analysis, natural language processing, data mining, knowledge graphs, and related fields.

Semantic computing addresses three core problems:
 Understanding the (possibly naturally-expressed) intentions (semantics) of users and expressing them in a machine-processable format
 Understanding the meanings (semantics) of computational content (of various sorts, including, but is not limited to, text, video, audio, process, network, software and hardware) and expressing them in a machine-processable format
 Mapping the semantics of user with that of content for the purpose of content retrieval, management, creation, etc.

The IEEE has held an International Conference on Semantic Computing since 2007.  A conference on Knowledge Graphs and Semantic Computing has been held since 2015.

See also
Computational semantics
Semantic audio
Semantic compression
Semantic technology

References

External links
 IEEE International Conference on Semantic Computing
 IEEE International School on Semantic Computing
 International Journal of Semantic Computing
 Semantic Computing Research Group
 Semantic Link Network

Semantic Web